Urban Forestry and Urban Greening is a peer-reviewed scientific journal published by Urban & Fischer, an imprint of Elsevier. The editor-in-chief is Wendy Chen. Coverage includes research regarding urban and peri-urban forests and other nearby vegetation.

Abstracting and indexing
This journal is indexed and abstracted in:
Science Citation Index Expanded
Social Sciences Citation Index
Biological Abstracts 
BIOSIS Previews 
Current Contents/Agriculture, Biology & Environmental Sciences
Current Contents/Social and Behavioral Science
GEOBASE
Scopus

See also
Urban area

References

External links

Elsevier academic journals

Publications established in 2002
English-language journals
Forestry journals